is a professional Japanese baseball player.

Mai Ozeki, his daughter, was one of the members of female idol group Country Girls.

External links

1976 births
Living people
Baseball people from Tochigi Prefecture
Japanese baseball players
Nippon Professional Baseball outfielders
Seibu Lions players
Yomiuri Giants players
Yokohama BayStars players
Nippon Professional Baseball Rookie of the Year Award winners
Japanese baseball coaches
Nippon Professional Baseball coaches